John William Montagu, 7th Earl of Sandwich PC (8 November 1811 – 3 March 1884), styled Viscount Hinchingbrooke from 1814 to 1818, was a British peer and Conservative politician. He served under Lord Derby as Captain of the Honourable Corps of Gentlemen-at-Arms in 1852 and as Master of the Buckhounds between 1858 and 1859.

Background and education

Montagu was the son of George Montagu, 6th Earl of Sandwich, and his wife Lady Louisa Mary Ann Julia Harriett, daughter of Armar Lowry-Corry, 1st Earl Belmore. He succeeded his father in the earldom in 1818 at the age of six. He was educated at Eton and Trinity College, Cambridge. While at Cambridge he played two first-class matches for the Cambridge University Cricket Club.

Political career
Lord Sandwich served in the Earl of Derby's first administration as Captain of the Honourable Corps of Gentlemen-at-Arms from February to December 1852 and was admitted to the Privy Council the same year. When the Conservatives returned to power under Derby in 1858 Sandwich was appointed Master of the Buckhounds, an office he retained until the government fell the following year. Apart from his political career he was also Lord-Lieutenant of Huntingdonshire between 1841 and 1884.

Family
Lord Sandwich married firstly Lady Mary Paget, daughter of Field Marshal Henry Paget, 1st Marquess of Anglesey, in 1838. After her death in 1859 he married secondly Lady Blanche Egerton, daughter of Francis Egerton, 1st Earl of Ellesmere, in 1865. He died in March 1884, aged 72, and was succeeded in his titles by his eldest son from his first marriage, Edward. The Countess of Sandwich died in 1894.

References

1811 births
1884 deaths
Lord-Lieutenants of Huntingdonshire
Members of the Privy Council of the United Kingdom
John Montagu, 07th Earl of Sandwich
English cricketers
Cambridge University cricketers
Honourable Corps of Gentlemen at Arms
People educated at Eton College
Alumni of Trinity College, Cambridge
English cricketers of 1826 to 1863
Presidents of the Marylebone Cricket Club
Masters of the Buckhounds
Earls of Sandwich